Gorgasia inferomaculata is an eel in the family Congridae (conger/garden eels). It was described by Jacques Blache in 1977. It is a non-migratory marine, tropical eel which is known from the Gulf of Guinea, in the eastern central Atlantic Ocean.

References

inferomaculata
Taxa named by Jacques Blache
Fish described in 1977